The Siegfried class was a group of six coastal defense ships built by the German Kaiserliche Marine ("Imperial Navy") in the late 19th century. The ships were intended to protect the German coastline from naval attacks. All six ships were named after Norse mythological figures.

The Siegfried-class ships were obsolete by the outbreak of World War I, and saw only limited service in their intended role before they were withdrawn from active duty. The ships then served in a variety of secondary duties, including barracks ships, target ships, and in the case of Beowulf, an icebreaker in the Baltic Sea. All six ships were struck from the naval register on 17 June 1919, days before the Treaty of Versailles was signed. Five of the ships were sold for scrapping immediately after they were struck from the register (with Hildebrand being lost in transit), but Frithjof was purchased by a shipping company, and converted into a freighter. She served in this capacity until she too was scrapped in 1930.

Design 
In the late 1880s, the German Kaiserliche Marine grappled with the problem of what type of capital ship to build in the face of limited naval budgets (owing to parliamentary objections to naval spending and the cost of dredging the Kaiser Wilhelm Canal). General Leo von Caprivi, the new Chef der Admiralität (Chief of the Admiralty), requested a series of design proposals, which ranged in size from small  coastal defense ships armed with a battery of two  guns to heavily-armed  ocean-going battleships equipped with seven  guns. Caprivi ordered ten coastal defense ships to guard the entrances to the canal, since even opponents of the navy in the Reichstag (Imperial Diet) agreed that such vessels were necessary.

Two of these guns were carried in open barbettes side-by-side forward, as German naval theorists still favored ramming attacks that required a capability for end-on fire. The ships were to carry a secondary battery of six  Hotchkiss revolver cannon for defense against torpedo boats, but tests conducted at the firing range at Meppen revealed that the guns were insufficient against modern vessels. As a result, the battery was increased to eight  guns.

General characteristics 

All six ships were heavily rebuilt, each undergoing refits at various times between 1898 and 1904. The ships' beams remained the same, but their draft was slightly decreased, to  forward and  aft.

The ships used transverse and longitudinal steel frames in the hull. They had eight watertight compartments and a double bottom that ran for 60% of the hull. After the refits, one more watertight compartment was added. The ships were described as good sea boats; they had gentle motion and were very responsive to commands from the helm. The ships lost significant speed in heavy seas, however. The ships had a crew of 20 officers and 256 enlisted men, with an additional 6 officers and 22 men when serving as a flagship. The refit increased crew requirements, to an additional 31 sailors normally, and the extra flagship crew increased to 9 officers and 34 men. The ships carried a number of smaller boats, including one picket boat, one pinnace, two cutters, one yawl, and one dinghy.

Propulsion 

The ships were powered by two sets of 3-cylinder triple-expansion engines, each in its own engine room. This was the first use of triple-expansion machinery in a major German warship. The ships had eight marine type boilers, with the exception of Hagen, which was equipped with eight Thornycroft boilers. Each ship had three electric generators that provided between 29–26 kilowatts at 67 volts.

At , the ships could only steam . Siegfried received completely oil-fired boilers during her refit in 1895, but these boilers proved to be very inefficient and she later received the mixed-firing boilers installed on the other vessels.

Armament 

The ships' primary armament consisted of three 24 cm K L/35 guns. In an arrangement very unusual for such large guns, two of which were mounted in a pair of MPL C/88 turrets forward side-by-side, while the third was mounted in a single turret aft. The guns could train 150 degrees to either side of the centerline, and depress to −4 degrees and elevate to 25 degrees. The guns had an ammunition storage of 204 rounds, or 68 shells per gun. The guns had a rate of fire of around 2 shells per minute.

The ships also had a secondary battery of eight 8.8 SK L/30 guns with 1,500 rounds of ammunition, though Siegfried only had six of these guns. After the refit, this was increased to ten 8.8 cm guns, and the munition storage correspondingly increased to 2,500 rounds. The 8.8 cm gun fired a  projectile at a muzzle velocity of 590 m/s (1,936 m/s). The guns could sustain a rate of fire of approximately 15 rounds per minute. Six machine guns were temporarily fitted.

The ships were also equipped with four  torpedo tubes. One tube was mounted in the stern in an above-water swivel mount, two were placed laterally, also above water, and the fourth was in the bow. The torpedo tubes were supplied with a total of 10 torpedoes. After the refit, the stern and lateral tubes were replaced with  weapons, but the lateral torpedo tubes were submerged. They had 8 torpedoes between them. The bow tube was retained, but also moved below the waterline; it had three torpedoes.

Armor 
The ships' armor consisted of compound steel for the first three ships and Krupp armor for the last three, coupled with teak.

Construction 

The six ships of the Siegfried class were built by a combination of private and government shipyards. Siegfried was laid down at the Germaniawerft dockyard in Kiel in 1888. The ship was ordered as the coast defense ship "O" under construction number 44. She was launched on 10 August 1889 and commissioned into the fleet on 29 April 1890. Beowulf was built at AG Weser in Bremen from 1890 to 1892. She had been ordered as "P", under construction number 100. Beowulf was launched on 8 November 1890 and commissioned on 1 April 1892. Frithjof was also built at AG Weser, under construction number 101 and the provisional name "Q". She was launched on 21 July 1891 and commissioned into active service on 23 February 1893.

Heimdall, Hildebrand, and Hagen were all built at Imperial Navy dockyards, with Heimdall at the Kaiserliche Werft Wilhelmshaven and the latter two at the Kaiserliche Werft Kiel. Heimdall was laid down in 1891 under construction number 14 and the provisional name "U"; she was launched on 27 July 1892 and commissioned on 7 April 1894. Hildebrand and Hagen were ordered as "R" and "S", respectively. Hildebrand was laid down in 1890, launched on 6 August 1892, and commissioned on 28 October 1893. Hagen, the last ship of the class, was laid down in 1891, launched on 21 October 1893, and completed on 2 October 1894.

Ships in class

Service history 

The ships of the Siegfried class saw only limited service in their intended roles. The revolutions in capital ship building in the first decade of the 20th century rapidly made these ships obsolete. The Second Naval Law, passed on 27 March 1908, reduced the service life of all capital ships from 25 years to 20 years. This meant that the Siegfried-class ships, along with a number of other vessels, were to be replaced as soon as possible.

As the new battleships were intended for offensive operations, the Siegfried class was still retained for coast defense duties. The ships served in this capacity through the start of World War I, until they were withdrawn from active service in 1915. Afterward, all six ships served in a variety of secondary roles, primarily as barracks ships. All six ships were struck from the naval register on 17 June 1919, shortly before the Treaty of Versailles, which ended the First World War, was signed. Siegfried was a barracks ship in Wilhelmshaven from 1916. She was intended to be rebuilt as a salvage ship, but this plan was abandoned and the vessel was sold to H. Peters, Wewelsfleth, in 1919 for 425,000 marks. She was broken up in 1920 in Kiel. Beowulf served as a target ship for U-boats from 1916 to 1918, when she transitioned to ice-breaking duty in the Baltic Sea. Frithjof was a barracks ship in Danzig after 1916. Following her removal from navy service, she was sold to A Bernstein in Hamburg. She was rebuilt as a freighter by Deutsche Werke, and served in this capacity until she was broken up in 1930. She was the longest serving Siegfried-class ship.

Heimdall was a barracks ship for the crews of U-boats and the Ems coast defense flotilla based in Emden. Like Siegfried, Heimdall was intended to be reconstructed as a salvage ship, and this was likewise abandoned. She was broken up for scrap metal in 1921. Hildebrand was a barracks ship in Windau after she was removed from active duty. She was sold to a Dutch ship-breaking firm in 1919, but while en route to the scrapyard, she became grounded on the Dutch coast. The wreck was blown up in 1933, and eventually scrapped in situ. Hagen was a barracks ship in Libau, Danzig, and Warnemünde during the remainder of World War I. She was sold for scrapping to Norddeutsche Tiefbaugesellschaft after the end of the war.

Footnotes

References

Further reading
 

Coastal defense ship classes